Phổ Yên is a provincial city of Thái Nguyên Province in the northeastern region of Vietnam. As of 2021, the city had a population of 231,363. The city covers an area of 258.42 km².

Administrative divisions
Phổ Yên is subdivided into 18 commune-level subdivisions, including the 13 wards of: Ba Hàng, Bãi Bông, Bắc Sơn, Đắc Sơn, Đông Cao, Đồng Tiến, Hồng Tiến, Nam Tiến, Tân Hương, Tân Phú, Tiên Phong, Thuận Thành, Trung Thành and 5 rural communes of: Minh Đức, Phúc Tân, Phúc Thuận, Thành Công, Vạn Phái.

References

Districts of Thái Nguyên province
Cities in Vietnam
Thái Nguyên province